The 2016 Puerto Rico Democratic presidential primary took place on June 5 in the U.S. territory of Puerto Rico as one of the Democratic Party's primaries ahead of the 2016 presidential election.

Clinton was a heavy favorite to win the territory's primary. In her two terms as United States Senator from New York, the state with the largest population of Puerto Rican-Americans, she gained a strong degree of familiarity with the island. Those connections helped her build institutional support from top Puerto Rico Democrats, including then-Governor Alejandro García Padilla.

No other Democratic or Republican primaries took place on the same day. The Republican Party's  Puerto Rico primary took place on March 6, 2016.

Results

Results By Districts

References

Puerto Rico
Democratic primary